This is a list of fellows of the Royal Society elected in 1705.

Fellows
 Francis Hauksbee (c. 1666–1713)
 Gilbert Heathcote (1652–1733)
 William King (1650–1729)
 Dacre Barret Lennard (d. 1733)
 John Mortimer (c. 1656–1736)
 William Nicolson (1655–1727)
 John Thorpe (1682–1750)
 Henry Worsley (c. 1675–1740), Army officer, MP and Governor of Barbados

References

1705
1705 in science
1705 in England